Kintessack is a locality and village in the parish of Dyke and Moy,  northwest of Forres in Moray, Scotland.

History
The Murray of Culbin family held the lands in the 13th century.

Notes

References
The New Statistical Account of Scotland: Banff. Elgin, Nairn. Volume 13. The New Statistical Account of Scotland, Society for the Benefit of the Sons and Daughters of the Clergy Collaborateur, Society for the Benefit of the Sons and Daughters of the Clergy. W. Blackwood and Sons, 1845. page 227.

Villages in Moray